Helmuth Schneider (18 December 1920 – 17 March 1972) was a German actor.

Schneider portrayed the role of Uncle Dimitri in The White Horses. 

He died in a traffic accident in Rio de Janeiro in 1972.

Selected filmography

1944: Dreaming - Student
1945: No Trampolim da Vida
1950: Écharpe de Seda
1951: The Goddess of Rio Beni - Edgar (German version)
1952: Two People - Rochus Graf Enna
1952: Meu Destino É Pecar - Maurício 
1953: The Mill in the Black Forest - Paul Kemper
1953: Under the Stars of Capri - Vincenz Rainalter
1954: Annie from Tharau - Adrian Rotenbach
1954: Schützenliesel - Stefan Brandner
1955: The Fisherman from Heiligensee - Stefan Staudacher
1955: The Forest House in Tyrol - Michael Reimers, Hotelbesitzersohn
1956: Ein Herz schlägt für Erika - Franz Wagner
1956: A Thousand Melodies - Thomas Hoff
1956: Die Rosel vom Schwarzwald - Martin
1956: Three Birch Trees on the Heath - Hans Freese, Revierförster
1957: Frauen sind für die Liebe da - Philipp Hansen
1957: The King of Bernina - Markus
1957:  - Franz Sixt
1958: Zwei Matrosen auf der Alm - Toni Leitner
1959:  - Kara Ben Nemsi
1960: Cavalcade - Ernst Herrera
1960: Stahlnetz:  (TV series episode) - Elling
1961: The Story of Joseph and His Brethren - Zebulon
1961: Drei weiße Birken - Hannes
1963: Captain Sindbad - Bendar
1964: The Secret Invasion - German Patrol Boat Captain
1964: Stahlnetz:  (TV series episode) - Bertram Bischoff
1966: Le facteur s'en va-t-en guerre - Maury 
1966: Is Paris Burning? - Adjudant allemand métro
1966: La Grande Vadrouille - L'officier allemand dans le train 
1966: The White Horses (TV series) - Uncle Dimitri
1967: Dirty Heroes - SS Gen. Hassler
1968: Untamable Angelique - (uncredited)
1968: Assignment K - Franz Ulrich (uncredited)
1968: Angelique and the Sultan - Colin Paturel
1970: Battle of the Commandos - Pvt. Sam Schrier
1970: Chuck Moll - Joe Caldwell
1970: The Fifth Day of Peace - Col. von Bleicher
1970: Kemek - Paul
1972:  - General von Klapwitz

References

External links

1920 births
1972 deaths
German male film actors
German male television actors
Male actors from Munich
Road incident deaths in Brazil
20th-century German male actors